"Can't Stop Me" is a song by Dutch house producer Afrojack in collaboration with Shermanology. The song was written by Afrojack, Dorothy Sherman, Andy Sherman, Tearce Kizzo, and co-produced by Afrojack along with the latter two. The single was released on 23 January 2012 through Afrojack's Wall Recordings (via Spinnin' Records).

Dutch DJ Tiësto provided an exclusive remix of the song which was included on his Club Life: Volume Two Miami CD. The song's instrumental hook was re-created in the song "Rest of My Life", performed by Ludacris featuring Usher and David Guetta.

Music video
A music video to accompany the release of "Can't Stop Me" was first released onto YouTube on 1 May 2012 at a total length of three minutes and twenty-one seconds. An alternative version of the same video uses the Afrojack & Buddha edit of the song, and has a length of three minutes and thirty-six seconds.

Track listing

Chart performance

Weekly charts

Year-end charts

Release history

References

2012 singles
Afrojack songs
Songs written by Afrojack
2011 songs
Spinnin' Records singles